Mamta Kaash (born March 29, 1964) is an actress and producer who has worked in television, radio and theatre in the UK. Born in India, she is the daughter of a journalist for the BBC World Service.

As an actress, she is perhaps best known for her roles in the BBC1 medical dramas Casualty, in which she played Dr Beth Ramanee, and Angels, as Nargis Khan. In 1985, she appeared in the long-running Yorkshire Television soap opera Emmerdale Farm. She also appeared in the Scottish soap opera River City, playing the role of Hana Malik. Mamta also played the role of Mahatma Gandhi's adopted daughter Abha Chatterjee in the British television series Lord Mountbatten: The Last Viceroy

Theatre roles have included Moti Roti Puttli Chunni at Theatre Royal Stratford East (1993) and MAA at the Royal Court Theatre (1995). More recently, Kaash has focused on work as a producer. In 2013 she once again collaborated with director Gareth Jones as a co-producer of the film Delight, an awards nominee at the Moscow International Film Festival.

Awards
Kaash won Best Actress award at the 1989 Cannes Festival International de Programmes Audiovisuels for her performance in the five-part BBC2 drama Shalom Salaam, a role for which she received widespread critical acclaim, with the drama also winning best screenplay for writer/director Gareth Jones.

References

External links

Interview on Holby TV
British Film Institute filmography

1964 births
Living people
British television actresses
British actresses of Indian descent
Indian emigrants to the United Kingdom
20th-century British actresses